Alper Göbel (born 11 October 1982) is a Dutch retired footballer who its last known to have played as a defender for DETO.

Career

Göbel started his career with Dutch second division side Go Ahead Eagles, where he made 116 appearances and scored 3 goals and received interest from the Turkish top flight. On 17 December 2004, Göbel debuted for Go Ahead Eagles during a 2-2 draw with Sparta (Rotterdam). On 9 February 2007, scored his first goal for Go Ahead Eagles during a 4-0 win over FC Eindhoven. In 2009, Göbel signed for Göztepe in the Turkish third division, where he said, "I was sitting at the window and suddenly a boulder flew through the window, glass everywhere. We were pelted from all sides, while police also drove in front of and behind the bus. Moments later, an ax flew right through the window. Thanks to the driver, who kept driving, we made it out alive. There was much panic and much blood. I was sick of it. Our team manager got something in his eye and is now half blind. In Turkey that made the national news, because even for them this was exceptional."  Before the second half of 2010-11, he signed for Dutch fourth division club Spakenburg.

References

External links
 
 Alper Göbel at playmakerstats.com

Dutch footballers
Dutch expatriate sportspeople in Turkey
Eerste Divisie players
Derde Divisie players
DETO Twenterand players
Go Ahead Eagles players
Association football defenders
FC Den Bosch players
Dutch people of Turkish descent
Dutch expatriate footballers
Expatriate footballers in Turkey
Living people
1982 births